Hyposcada is a genus of clearwing (ithomiine) butterflies, named by Frederick DuCane Godman and Osbert Salvin in 1879. They are in the brush-footed butterfly family, Nymphalidae.

Species
Arranged alphabetically:
 Hyposcada anchiala (Hewitson, 1868)
 Hyposcada attilodes Kaye, 1918
 Hyposcada illinissa (Hewitson, 1851)
 Hyposcada schausi Fox, 1941
 Hyposcada taliata (Hewitson, 1874)
 Hyposcada virginiana (Hewitson, 1856)
 Hyposcada zarepha (Hewitson, 1869)

References

Ithomiini
Nymphalidae of South America
Nymphalidae genera
Taxa named by Frederick DuCane Godman
Taxa named by Osbert Salvin